Lury-sur-Arnon (literally Lury on Arnon) is a commune in the Cher department in the Centre-Val de Loire region of France.

Geography

Population

Sights
 The church of St. Paul, dating from the nineteenth century.
 The castle, dating from the twelfth century.
 The restored Gothic chapel.
 A twelfth-century gatehouse tower.

See also
Communes of the Cher department

References

Communes of Cher (department)